Marco D'Amore (born 12 June 1981) is an Italian actor, film director and screenwriter, best known for his role as Ciro Di Marzio in the television series Gomorrah and the film The Immortal (2019).

Biography 
In 2000, D'Amore was cast in the play "The adventure of Pinocchio," produced by the theatre company of Toni Servillo.

 
In 2005, he decided to found a theatre company "La Piccola Società" that produced many plays and a short film. In 2010, D'Amore was cast, again alongside Toni Servillo, in the film A Quiet Life, and also in Love is All You Need (2011) and Perez. (2011). 

In 2014, he was cast as Ciro Di Marzio in the television crime drama Gomorrah. In 2019, he directed The Immortal, both a prequel and a sequel to the events after the third season of the TV series Gomorrah.

Filmography

Film

Television

References

External links 
 

1981 births
Italian male film actors
Italian male television actors
Living people
People from Caserta